The 2002–03 season was the 33rd season in the existence of Toulouse FC and the club's first season back in the second division of French football. In addition to the domestic league, Toulouse participated in this season's edition of the Coupe de France and the Coupe de la Ligue.

Players

First-team squad

Transfers

In

Out

Competitions

Overall record

Ligue 2

League table

Results summary

Results by round

Matches

Coupe de France

Coupe de la Ligue

Statistics

Appearances and goals

|-
! colspan=14 style=background:#dcdcdc; text-align:center| Goalkeepers

|-
! colspan=14 style=background:#dcdcdc; text-align:center| Defenders

|-
! colspan=14 style=background:#dcdcdc; text-align:center| Midfielders

|-
! colspan=14 style=background:#dcdcdc; text-align:center| Forwards

Goalscorers

References

Toulouse FC seasons
Toulouse